During the 1944–45 English football season, Brentford competed in the Football League South, due to the cessation of competitive football for the duration of the Second World War. The Bees finished in a wartime-high of 3rd-place, scoring 100 goals in both the league and Football League War Cup, with forwards Len Townsend and Bob Thomas accounting for over half the team's total.

Season summary

The familiar pattern of player unavailability prevailed as Brentford entered the 1944–45 Football League South season, with 60 players eventually being used over the course of the league, cup and friendly matches during the campaign. A number of the club's amateur players were pressed into service during the regular season, as were 30 guests, many of whom made three appearances or less.

Aided by prolific scoring from forwards Len Townsend and Bob Thomas, Brentford rocketed along in the first half of the season, losing just four of 22 matches and posting big wins by margins of four, five and six goals. The Bees' form evaporated when the Football League War Cup campaign got underway in February 1945, losing four of six matches to crash out in the group stage. Brentford lost four of the remaining six league matches of the season, with the final match away to Watford (which had been postponed in January 1945) taking place after VE Day, which marked the end of the Second World War in Europe.

On 21 November 1944, Ralph Shields became the second and final Brentford player to die while on service in the Second World War. A forward between 1921 and 1922, Shields had emigrated to Australia in 1927 and was serving as a private in the Australian Army Service Corps when he died as a prisoner of war in Sandakan Prisoner of War Camp, North Borneo on 21 November 1944.

League table

Results 
Brentford's goal tally listed first.

Legend

Football League South

Football League South War Cup 

 Source: 100 Years Of Brentford

Playing squad 
 Players' ages are as of the opening day of the 1944–45 season.

 Sources: Timeless Bees, Football League Players' Records 1888 to 1939, 100 Years Of Brentford

Coaching staff

Statistics

Appearances and goals

Players listed in italics left the club mid-season.
Source: 100 Years Of Brentford

Goalscorers 

Players listed in italics left the club mid-season.
Source: 100 Years Of Brentford

Wartime international caps

Management

Summary

Transfers & loans 
Guest players' arrival and departure dates correspond to their first and last appearances of the season.

References 

Brentford F.C. seasons
Brentford